Great Boston Fire can refer to:

 Great Boston Fire of 1760
 Great Boston Fire of 1872